Ramayan (also known as Ramanand Sagar's Ramayan) is an Indian Hindi-language epic television series based on ancient Indian Sanskrit Epic Ramayana. The show was created, written, and directed by Ramanand Sagar. It originally aired between 1987 and 1988 on DD National and it was narrated by Ashok Kumar and the director Ramanand Sagar. The music was composed by Ravindra Jain. During its run, the show became most watched television series in the world, it had a viewership of 82 percent. The repeat telecast was aired on 20 different channels in 17 countries on all the five continents at different times.The success of the series was documented well by the media. According to BBC, the serial has been viewed by over 650 million viewers. Each episode of the series reportedly earned DD National 40 Lakh.

The show is primarily based on Valmiki's Ramayan (Critical Edition) and Tulsidas' Ramcharitmanas. Other sources used were: Tamil Kamb Ramayan, Marathi Bhavarath Ramayan, Bengali Krutivas Ramayan, Telugu Shri Rangnath Ramayan, Kannada Ramchandra Charit Puranam, Malayalam Adhyatma Ramayan, Urdu Ramayan by Chakbast. Ramayan was the most expensive TV show produced during at the time with a budget ₹9 Lakhs per episode.

BBC recalled that when the series was telecast every Sunday morning, "streets would be deserted, shops would be closed and people would bathe and garland their TV sets before the serial began." The series was reaired during the 2020 Coronavirus Lockdown with the broadcaster saying the show had 77 million viewers on 16 April 2020.

Plot
Adapted and based on the ancient Hindu epic Ramayana, the series follows the journey of Ram who goes to an exile of 14 years along with Sita and Lakshman.

Shri Vishnu decides to incarnate on earth as Ram, the son of King Dashrath and Queen Kaushalya of Ayodhya to kill Ravan, the evil king of Lanka and establish dharma whereas Goddess Lakshmi would incarnate as his wife Sita. In Ayodhya, a childless Dashrath conducts a yagna for children and as a result, his three wives gives birth to 4 sons. Kaushalya to Ram, Kaikeyi to Bharat and Sumitra to Lakshman and Shatrughan. The 4 boys grow up to be excellent warriors under Guru Vashista's training. Ram is an ideal and perfect son and brother and is a role model to his three younger brothers and always respects his parents and their affection towards him.

After the brothers return after completing their education, Rishi Vishvamitra arrives at Ayodhya for help as his yagna is disturbed by some demons and asks Dashrath to send Ram to him to kill those demons. Dashrath reluctantly agrees and Lakshman also accompanies Ram. Shri Ram succeeds in killing Taraka and her son Subahu and also protects the yagnas. Rishi Vishvamitra later teaches him about many things required for future.

Later, he takes the two brothers to Mithila to seek the blessings of Lord Shiva's bow at the swayamvar of Princess Sita. Rishi Vishvamitra tells them about the birth of Sita from earth. On their way Ram frees Ahalya of her curse by her husband Rishi Gautama.

Cast
 Main 
Arun Govil as Ram, Lord Vishnu's 7th incarnation of the Dashavatar; Dasharatha and Kaushalya's son; Sita's husband; Bharat, Lakshman And Shatrughan's elder brother.
Deepika Chikhalia as Sita/Lakshmi, Goddess Lakshmi's incarnation; Janak and Sunaina's elder adoptive daughter; Bhumi Devi's daughter; Urmila's elder adoptive sister; Ram's wife
Sunil Lahri as Lakshman, Sheshnaag's incarnation; Dasharatha And Sumitra's elder twin son; Urmila's husband; Ram And Bharat's younger brother And Shatrughan's elder twin
Arvind Trivedi as Ravana / Vishrava, Vishrava And Kaikesi's eldest son; Kumbhakarna, Vibhishan and Surpanakha's elder brother, Indrajit's father, Mandodari's husband.
Dara Singh as Hanuman, Lord Shiva's incarnation; Lord Ram's devotee, Anjani and Kesari's son, Vayu's son.

 Recurring 
Sanjay Jog as Bharat, the incarnation of Panchajanya, the conch held by Lord Vishnu'; Dasharatha and Kaikeyi's son; Mandavi's husband; Ram's younger brother, and Lakshman and Shatrughan's elder brother
Sameer Rajda as Shatrughna, the incarnation of Lord Vishnu's Sudarshana; Dasharatha and Sumitra's younger twin son; Shrutakirti's husband, and Ram, and Bharat's younger brother, Lakshman's younger twin
Bal Dhuri as Dasharatha, King Aja and Queen Indumati's son; Kausalya, Kaikeyi, and Sumitra's husband; Ram, Bharat, Laxman and Shatrughan's father, King of Kosala 
Jayshree Gadkar as Kausalya, Dasharatha's first wife; Ram's mother
Padma Khanna as Kaikeyi, Dasharatha's second wife; Bharat's mother, Ram's foster Mother.
Rajnibala as Sumitra, Dasharatha's third wife; Lakshman and Shatrughan's mother
Lalita Pawar as Manthara, Kaikeyi's evil maid
Vijay Arora as Indrajit, Ravan and Mandodari's first son; Sulochana's husband; slayen by Lakshman.
Nalin Dave as Kumbhakarna, Vishrava and Kaikesi's second son; Ravana, Vibhishan and Surpanakha brother; slayen by Ram.
Mukesh Rawal as Vibhishana, Vishrava and Kaikesi's third son; Ravana, Kumbhakaran and Surpanakha's brother; King of Lanka.
Aparajita Bhushan as Mandodari, Ravan's first wife; Mayasura and Apsara Hema's daughter; Mayavi and Dundubhi's sister; Meghanaad, and Akshayakumara's mother.
Shyam Sundar Kalani as Sugriva Sugriva-Vali's brother; Ruma's husband. Also Vali, Sugriva's brother and also played role of Yamraj God of death. 
Sudhir Dalvi as Vasishtha, Raghukul brothers' teacher
Chandrashekhar as Sumantra, Dasrath's minister
Renu Dhariwal as Shurpanakha, Vishrava and Kaikesi's daughter; Ravana, Kumbhakaran and Vibhishan's sister. Her Nose was Cut by Lakshman.
Radha Yadav as Tara, Vali's wife and Angad's mother
Mulraj Rajda as Janaka, Kushadhwaja's brother; Sunaina's husband; Sita and Urmila's father King of Mithila
Urmila Bhatt as Sunaina, Janak's wife; Sita and Urmila's mother, Queen of Mithila
Rajshekar Upadhyay as Jambhava, 
Bashir Khan as Angad, Tara and Vali's son / Vajramushti (Lankan General)
Anjali Vyas as Urmila, Goddess Naga Lakshmi's incarnation; Janak and Sunaina's younger daughter; Sita's sister; Lakshmana's wife
Sulakshana Khatri as Mandavi, Goddess Lakshmi's flower avatar; Kushadhwaja and Chandrabhaga's elder daughter; Shrutakirti's elder sister; Bharat's wife; Sita's cousin
Poonam Shetty as Shrutakirti, Goddess Lakshmi's flower; Kushadhwaja and Chandrabhaga's younger daughter; Mandavi's younger sister; Sita's cousin; Shatrughan's wife
Vijay Kavish as Shiva, Parvati's husband/ Mayasura Mandodari's father, Ravan's father in law/Maharshi Valmiki, author of Ramayan
Pushpa Verma as Sulochana, Meghanaad's wife.
Ramesh Chapaneri as Malyavan and Agastya
Chandrakant Pandey as Nishad
Girish Seth as Nal, Neel's brother / Gandharva 
Giriraj Shukla as Neel, Nal's brother/Prahasta
Vibhuti Dave as Trijata, Sita's caretaker
Sarita Devi as Shabari, Ram's devotee
Aslam Khan as Samudra Dev and various roles
Bandini Mishra as Parvati, Shiva's wife
Murari Lal Gupta as Akampana. 
Mahesh Bhatt as Shatanand, Ahilya Devi & Gauatam Rishi's son, priest of Janak
Shrikant Soni as Vishwamitra
Kaustubh Trivedi as Kewat
Bhushan Lakandari as Vishnu
Sunil Verma as Garuda/Indra/Jatayu/Narantak
Ramesh Goyal as Maarich
Kapil Kumar as Akshayakumara, Ravan and Mandodari's Second son; Meghnath's brother
Madhu Priya as Apsara Avtar of Shurpanakha
Rajendra Jain as Kalanemi
Mayuresh Kshetramhade as Luv, Ram and Sita's younger son; Kush's twin
Swapnil Joshi as Kush, Ram and Sita's elder son; Luv's twin
Randhir Singh as Viradh/Rakshas/Sursa/Atikaye

Production
Ramayan was regarded as the most expensive TV show produced during the time with a budget ₹9 Lakhs per episode.

Development
Writing for the Indian Express upon completion of the airing of the series' final episode, former bureaucrat S. S. Gill wrote that it was during his tenure as the secretary with the Ministry of Information and Broadcasting in September 1985 that he contacted Ramanand Sagar in association with the project.

Gill added that in a letter to Sagar, he had written about the Ramayana as a subject for the television series was ideal in that it was "a repository of moral and social values" and that its message was "secular and universal".

He added that he had noted in the letter that Sagar's "real challenge would lie in seeing the epic "with the eyes of a modern man and relating its message to the spiritual and emotional needs of our age".

Gill added that he also wrote a similar letter to B. R. Chopra over the production of the series Mahabharat based on another epic of the same name, and mentioned that both he and Sagar accepted to his suggestions and constituted panels of experts and scholars to conceptualize the production.

The series was initially conceptualized to run for 52 episodes of 45 minutes each. But, owing to popular demand it had to be extended thrice, eventually ending after 78 episodes.

Initially, Both Ramayan and Mahabharat was planned to air together, but later it was decided to air Ramayan first which was followed by Mahabharat after its end.

Casting

Govil expressed his desire to play Rama and appeared for a screen test. Initially, he was considered to be inappropriate for the role. He then appeared for the screen test again wearing a smile on his face and got finalized for the role. Since Govil's collaboration with Debashree Roy in Kanak Mishra's Jiyo To Aise Jiyo (1981) was adulated, the actress was approached to play Sita but due to her hectic schedule in Bengali cinema, she failed to appear for the screen test.

Several other famous actresses were approached as well but all of them backed off due to the prevalent premonition that playing the role of Lady Sita would blemish their romantic appeal resulting doom to their on-screen career. Deepika Chikhalia was then summoned to appear for the screen test. She had to undergo rigorous screen tests and was finalized then.

Sanjay Jog was originally approached for the role of Lakshmana but he refused since he was unable to give bulk dates. Sagar then urged him to play Bharata since the role would not require bulk dates. The role of Lakshmana then went to Sunil Lahiri.

Arvind Trivedi went to audition for the role of a boatman where Ramanand Sagar chose him as Ravan. However, when Trivedi rejected the offer, Paresh Rawal convinced him for playing the role. Vijay Kavish played three roles in the series which were Shiva, Valmiki and Mayasura.

Broadcast
In India, the series was originally broadcast on DD National from 25th January, 1987 to 31st July, 1988 with widespread acclaim.  BBC recorded that it had a viewership of 82 percent, highest viewership in the world.

Reruns of the series aired on Star Plus and Star Utsav in 2000s. It was re-telecast again between March and April 2020 during the 2020 coronavirus lockdown in India on DD National and broke all records for viewership globally for any TV show. Hundreds of millions of viewers have watched the series during the 2020 coronavirus lockdown in India.

DD National said on 16 April 2020 the show created world record, 77 million people watched the show in 1 day. It was again telecasted on StarPlus from 4 May 2020. The show is dubbed in Kannada, Marathi, Bengali, Telugu and Tamil which aired on Star Suvarna, Star Pravah, Star Jalsha, Star Maa and Star Vijay respectively.

 Reception and legacy 
After just few episodes had been released, the show received widespread critical acclaim for Ramanand Sagar's writing and direction as well as its casting and Ravindra Jain's music.

D. K. Bose, the media director of Hindustan Thompson Associates, remarked, "The unique thing about the Ramayana was its consistency. Other programs like Buniyaad and even Hum Log did achieve viewership of around 80 percent and more, on occasion. In the case of Ramayana, that figure had been maintained almost from the beginning."

He added, “Starting at around 50 percent the 80 percent figure was reached within a few months and never went down. The viewership was more than 50 percent even in the predominantly non-Hindi speaking southern Indian States of Tamil Nadu, Kerala and Karnataka. The show's popularity spanned across religions and people of the Islam faith watched in high numbers as well. It was common among people threatening to burn down the local electricity board headquarters during a power outage."

The success of the series was documented well by the media. Soutik Biswas of BBC recalled that when the series was telecast every Sunday morning, "streets would be deserted, shops would be closed and people would bathe and garland their TV sets before the serial began."

Writing for the Telegraph, William Dalrymple noted, "In villages across south Asia, hundreds of people would gather around a single set to watch the gods and demons play out their destinies. In the noisiest and most bustling cities, trains, buses and cars came to a sudden halt, and a strange hush fell over the bazaars. In Delhi, government meetings had to be rescheduled after the entire cabinet failed to turn up for an urgent briefing."

Impact
The telecast of Ramayan was seen as a precursor to the Ayodhya dispute.

Arvind Rajagopal in his book Politics After Television: Hindu Nationalism and the Reshaping of the Public in India (2000) wrote that with the series, the government "violated a decades-old taboo on religious partisanship, and Hindu nationalists made the most of the opportunity." It confirmed to the idea of Hindu awakening and the rise of the Bharatiya Janata Party capitalizing on this."

Manik Sharma of Hindustan Times voiced similar views in that the series "played in the backdrop of a Hindutva shift in Indian politics, under the aegis of the Rashtriya Swayamsevak Sangh (RSS) and its political outfit, the Bharatiya Janata Party (BJP). While the media and cultural commentators struggled to consider Sagar's epic one way or the other, there were some who saw it as a catalyst, even if unintended, to the turmoil that the movement resulted in."

Regarding initial apprehensions about the series being aired by a government-owned broadcaster, it's hitherto producer Sharad Dutt said that "a lot of people within the channel's office weren't supportive of the idea, to begin with. But it had no motivation with what was going on politically. The Congress was in power and it had no agenda of the sort." He however felt the execution was poor and remembered questioning Sagar upon watching "the tape" if he had "made Ramayana or Ram-Leela". Sharma noted that the political clout the series held could be adjudged by the fact that Sagar and Arun Govil (who played Rama) "were repeatedly courted by both the Congress and the BJP to campaign for them", and that Deepika Chikhalia (Sita) and Arvind Trivedi (Ravana) went on to become members of parliament.

The series was re-telecast from 28 March 2020 with one hour episode during the morning and one hour episode during the night during the lockdown of 21 days due to coronavirus on DD National.

 Ratings Ramayan notably broke viewership for any Indian television series during that time. It was telecast in 55 countries and at a total viewership of 650 million and re-telecast (24 March - 18 April 2020) nearly 2500 million viewership alone in 25 days, it became the highest watched Indian television series by a distance, and one of top watched television series in world. It entered in the Limca Book of Records as the most watched historical series. On its first telecast (1987), it had 40 million viewership in India. That brought ₹23 crore revenue for the channel.

The viewership during lockdown garnered record highest ratings for a Hindi GEC (general entertainment channel) show since 2015 making DD National as the most watched Indian channel since its premiere.

Ramayan garnered a total of 170 million viewers in first 4 shows during which DD National became the most watched Indian television channel after many years. The following week it garnered 580 million impressions in morning slot and 835 million impressions in night slot.

In week 14 2020, it garnered 61.397 million impressions and the following week it got 67.4 million impressions.

Even the Wall Street Journal acknowledged the huge popularity of Ramayan's re-telecast during 2020
Sequel and remake

A follow-up series Luv Kush based on the last chapter of Ramayana Uttara Kanda, aired in October 1988 on DD National. A remake series Ramayan produced by Sagar Arts aired on NDTV Imagine in 2008.

References

Footnotes
 Karp, Jonathan and Williams, Michael. "Reigning Hindu TV Gods of India Have Viewers Glued to Their Sets." The Wall Street Journal, 22 April 1998
 
 
 
 National Endowment for the Humanities. "Lessons of the Epics: The Ramayana". EdSITEment Lesson Plans''. Available online from https://web.archive.org/web/20070205233230/http://edsitement.neh.gov/view_lesson_plan.asp?id=599 (18 January 2006).

External links

DD National original programming
Television shows based on poems
1987 Indian television series debuts
1988 Indian television series endings
1980s Indian television series
Television series based on the Ramayana